Jonas Kent Lennart Höglund (born August 29, 1972) is a Swedish former professional ice hockey player who played in the National Hockey League (NHL) with the Calgary Flames, Montreal Canadiens and the Toronto Maple Leafs.

Playing career
Höglund was drafted by the Calgary Flames in the 1992 NHL Entry Draft in the 10th round as the 222nd pick overall. He then also played Färjestads BK and played with them until 1996 when he joined Calgary Flames. In February 1998 the Flames traded Höglund and Zarley Zalapski to the Montreal Canadiens for Valeri Bure and a draft pick.

In July 1999, Höglund joined the Toronto Maple Leafs as a free agent. He played with the Leafs for four seasons. During his tenure with the Leafs, he often played on a line with countryman Mats Sundin, along with Mikael Renberg, which were also one of the lines in Tre Kronor. While Höglund's lack of scoring touch often frustrated fans, his hard work was consistently rewarded with first line ice time by head coach Pat Quinn. In September 2003, he signed a contract with the Florida Panthers in the National Hockey League (NHL). After failing to make the Panthers' roster, he left and played the 2003–04 season with the Swiss club HC Davos. After one year with Davos, Höglund went back to Sweden and Färjestads BK.

Höglund ended his 22-year professional career in the lower leagues in Sweden, playing his final season with Skåre BK of the Hockeyettan in 2009–10 season.

International play

He has played for the Swedish national team in the World Championship in 1997, 2003, 2004 and 2005. In 1997, 2003 and 2004 he and the Swedish national team finished in second place. All three times Canada won gold.

Career statistics

Regular season and playoffs

International

References

External links
 

1972 births
Living people
Calgary Flames draft picks
Calgary Flames players
Färjestad BK players
HC Davos players
HC Lugano players
Malmö Redhawks players
Montreal Canadiens players
Sportspeople from Karlstad
Södertälje SK players
Swedish expatriate ice hockey players in Canada
Swedish expatriate sportspeople in Switzerland
Swedish ice hockey right wingers
Toronto Maple Leafs players